Daniel Sande (born 25 August 1916) was an Argentine fencer. He competed at the 1948, 1952 and 1960 Summer Olympics.

References

External links

1916 births
Possibly living people
Argentine male fencers
Argentine sabre fencers
Olympic fencers of Argentina
Fencers at the 1948 Summer Olympics
Fencers at the 1952 Summer Olympics
Fencers at the 1960 Summer Olympics
Fencers from Buenos Aires
Pan American Games medalists in fencing
Pan American Games bronze medalists for Argentina
Fencers at the 1955 Pan American Games